Koh Kong is a province (khaet) of Cambodia.  Its capital is Khemarak Phoumin (Koh Kong).

Geography
The most southwestern province of Cambodia, Koh Kong has a long undeveloped coastline and a mountainous, forested, and largely inaccessible interior which includes part of the Cardamom Mountains, Cambodia's largest national park (Botum Sakor National Park), and a section of Kirirom National Park.

History
From 1795 to 1904 the area was under Siamese administration with the local name of "Koh Kong". During the reign of King Mongkut the name Patchan Khiri Khet was given to the city as a counterpart to Prachuap Khiri Khan, a city on the same latitude which also had its name changed during the same year. In 1904, the region and the city of Trat was ceded to French Indochina in exchange of French troop evacuation from Chanthaburi. In 1907 Trat was returned to Siam in exchange for the Siamese province of Inner Cambodia while Koh Kong remained part of French Cambodia.

After Cambodia's liberation from the Khmer Rouge in 1979, Koh Kong province was quite under-populated. After the national government encouraged people to live in Koh Kong, there has been a net influx of people. It is estimated that the average annual growth rate in Koh Kong is 16%, which has put pressure on the mangrove resources in the province. Koh Kong's towns have developed rapidly partially in response to market pressures from Thailand and because of immigration from other parts of Cambodia.

Economy
The province has been the site of a Sino-Cambodian port development project in Dara Sakor. The project is planned to spread over 45,000 hectares, to include casinos, golf courses, and resorts. A 20 kilometre stretch of coastline will be turned into a deep-water port to accommodate cruise ships as well as freight. Near the port, an airfield with a runway 3,400 metres is longer than needed for commercial flights, while its turning bays are too small for civilian aircraft.
Therefore, analysts suspect that the port project is a Cambodian-Chinese civil-military collaboration that will permit the Chinese navy to use the facilities as a forward operating base. Responding to US concerns, Prime Minister Hun Sen has denied the charge, pointing out that the Cambodian constitution "...has no provision for accommodating foreign military bases on its soil."

Districts
The province is divided into six districts and one municipality:

Border crossing

The province is an increasingly popular gateway to Cambodia from Hat Lek in eastern Thailand (Trat), in part due to the reasonably direct access to the port and beach resort town of Sihanoukville. The border is at Cham Yeam, about 14 km from Koh Kong.

Traveling to Koh Kong has been made easier, as bridges have been built, the first in 2002. The landmark Koh Kong Bridge was built by L.Y.P. Group. It is the second longest bridge in Cambodia (Neak Loeung Bridge took the number one spot in 2015). The 1,900-meter crossing can be seen connecting provincial town of Koh Kong to Koh Kong Resort and the Thai border. In 2007 a new sealed road (National Route 48) was completed from the town to Sre Ambel on the Phnom Penh to Sihanoukville highway, including four new bridges donated by the Thai government. They opened in May 2008.

References

External links
The Koh Kong Website
Koh Kong Provincial Resources
Kirirom National Park, Cambodia
Koh Kong Websites
Very comprehensive adventure site in Tatai

 
Provinces of Cambodia
Cambodia–Thailand border crossings
Gulf of Thailand